Your Life Is a Record is the third studio album by American country music artist Brandy Clark. It was released on March 6, 2020, via Warner Records. It includes the single "Who You Thought I Was". The album has received positive critical reception for Clark's songwriting skills. Despite wide acclaim, it was not as commercially successful as her previous albums, peaking at #46 the country charts and not making the Billboard Top 200 among all albums. It was nominated for the Grammy Award for Best Country Album.

On February 12, 2021, Clark announced that a deluxe edition of the album would be released on March 5, 2021, with six new songs, including live versions of "Pawn Shop" and "Who You Thought I Was" and a new version of "The Past Is the Past" featuring Lindsey Buckingham.

Recording and release
As the album was nearing completion, Clark and producer Jay Joyce made a conscious effort to avoid country music cliches, using experimental musicians and strings to make sounds unlike her previous work; the singer had anxiety about if Warner Records could successfully market it past the tepid reception to her 2016 album Big Day in a Small Town. To start the recordings, Clark and Joyce began with a simple acoustic combo and only later added electric elements or string arrangements to enhance the stripped-down recordings. The album was preceded by a music video for the track "Who You Thought I Was", one of many songs on the album discussing a break-up Clark had after a 15-year relationship. This was followed by a video for "Love Is a Fire" on February 14.

The track "Better Boat" was recorded as a duet with Randy Newman.

During the COVID-19 pandemic, Clark decided to release a deluxe edition of the album that included older recordings, a brief live performance for MusiCares, and the new composition "Remember Me Beautiful".

Critical reception

 Album of the Year rates the consensus at 81 with four reviews.

The editorial staff of AllMusic gave the album 4.5 out of five stars, with reviewer Stephen Thomas Erlewine summing up that it's "an album that feels like a classic not just through its sound but through its depth of feeling". For Slate, Carl Wilson wrote that the release is Clark's "most personal album" yet and praises the maturity of her songwriting: "Clark has mostly left behind the exercises in women-empowerment snark and spunk that her previous records leaned on for infusions of energy, a recourse that's become its own cliché in women’s country". In a brief preview for the week in country, Billboard highlighted the release, with Annie Reuter calling Clark's "adept songwriting" the center of the album; the publication later had a full review from Tom Roland who compared this album with Clarks's previous ones to find it the most authentic songwriting and performance of her career. In assessing the album, Clark's career, and the general state of contemporary country music, The New Yorkers David Cantwell declared that "no one is writing better country songs than Brandy Clark is" and that this third album is her finest. In American Songwriter, Jason Scott gave the album 4.5 out of five, joining voices calling it her finest release, explaining Clark's strength as musician as well as producer Jay Joyce's ability to augment her voice.

A more mixed review came from Pitchforks Sam Sodomsky, rating the album 7.5 out of 10, praising innovative arrangements and incisive and clever lyrics that will challenge listeners. Reviewing the album for Exclaim!, Kyle Mullin gave the release a seven out of 10, noting the same qualities and suggesting that other songwriters will "daydream about following in her footsteps". Chris Willman of Variety calls Clark as a songwriter "the necessary next stop [after the success of Kacey Musgraves] for anyone joining this program already in progress and finding that Music City is the richest source of fingerpicking female singer-songwriters with crystalline voices, classic twang-pop sensibilities and a knack for sweet devastation" and gives a positive review of this album for its myriad looks at relationships.

Track listing
"I'll Be the Sad Song" (Brandy Clark, Jesse Jo Dillon, Chase McGill) – 3:58
"Long Walk" (Clark, Jesse Frasure, Jay Joyce) – 2:39
"Love Is a Fire" (Clark, Joyce, Shane McAnally) – 4:01
"Pawn Shop" (Clark, Troy Verges) – 3:50
"Who You Thought I Was" (Clark, Joyce, Jonathan Singleton) – 3:09
"Apologies" (Clark, Scott Stepakoff, Forest Glen Whitehead) – 3:23
"Bigger Boat" (Clark, Adam Wright) – 3:34
"Bad Car" (Clark, Jason Saenz) – 3:02
"Who Broke Whose Heart" (Clark, McAnally) – 3:02
"Can We Be Strangers" (Clark,Clint Daniels , Dillon) – 3:29
"The Past Is the Past" (Clark, Luke Laird) – 5:00

Deluxe edition bonus tracks
"Who You Thought I Was" (Live from 3rd & Lindsley) (Clark, Dillon, and Singleton) – 3:13
"Pawn Shop" (Live from 3rd & Lindsley) (Clark and Verges) – 3:56
"Remember Me Beautiful" (Clark, Hillary Lindsey, Lori McKenna, and Liz Rose) – 4:25
"Like Mine" (Marla Cannon-Goodman, Clark, and Hailey Whitters) – 3:26
"Same Devil" (Cannon-Goodman, Clark, and Whitters) – 3:07
"The Past Is the Past" (Clark and Laird) – 3:35

Personnel
Brandy Clark – bass guitar, acoustic guitar piano, backing and lead vocals
Brent Anderson – backing vocals
Court Blankenship – assistant production
Lindsey Buckingham – guitar and vocals on Deluxe Edition version of "The Past Is the Past"
Brandi Carlile – vocals on "Same Devil"
Diane Cohen – violin
Daniel Gilbert – violin
Jedd Hughes – bass guitar; dobro; engineering; acoustic, baritone, and electric guitar, mandolin
Jay Joyce – bass guitar, drums, acoustic and electric guitar, mixing, Omnichord, production, programming, pump organ, synthesizer, vocals
Jonathan Kirkscey – cello, saxophone
Beth Luscombe – viola
Jimmy Mansfield – assistant engineering
Lannie McMillan – flute, saxophone
Andrew Mendelson – mastering
Bob Mitchell – engineering
Jessica Munson – baritone saxophone, violin
Randy Newman – vocals on "Bigger Boat"
John Osborne – dobro, backing vocals
Josh Osbourne – backing vocals
Chris Phelps – photography
Jennifer Puckett – viola
Giles Reaves – bongos, claves, djembe, drums, acoustic guitar, handclapping, marimba, percussion, piano, programming, synthesizer, synthesizer bass, tambourine, triangle
Jonathan Singleton – vocals
Kirk Smothers – flute
Lester Snell – arrangement, band leader, viola
Jim Spake – cello, baritone saxophone
Chris Taylor – assistant engineering
Scott Thompson – trumpet
Gary Topper – flute, violin
Priscilla Tsai – flute, violin
Stephan Walker – art direction
Forest Whitehead – backing vocals
Wen-Yih You – trumpet, violin

Charts

See also
List of 2020 albums

References

External links

Interview with Vulture discussing the album

2020 albums
Brandy Clark albums
Albums produced by Jay Joyce
Warner Records albums